Mátyás Farkas (13 August 1903 – 1 June 1981) was a Hungarian athlete. He competed in the men's decathlon at the 1928 Summer Olympics. He also competed in the ice hockey tournament at the 1936 Winter Olympics.

See also
 List of athletes who competed in both the Summer and Winter Olympic games

References

External links
 

1903 births
1981 deaths
Athletes (track and field) at the 1928 Summer Olympics
Ice hockey players at the 1936 Winter Olympics
Hungarian decathletes
Olympic athletes of Hungary
Olympic ice hockey players of Hungary
Athletes from Budapest
20th-century Hungarian people